The 1991 European Karate Championships, the 26th edition, was held in the sports complex of the National Indoor Arena in Hannover, Germany from May 2 to 4, 1991.

Medallists

Men's Competition

Individual

Team

Women's competition

Individual

Team

Medal table

References

External links
 Karate Records - European Championship 1991

1991
International sports competitions hosted by Germany
European Karate Championship
European championships in 1991
Sports competitions in Hanover
Karate competitions in Germany
European Karate Championships
1990s in Lower Saxony
20th century in Hanover